This article lists events in 2011 in Japan.

Incumbents 
 Emperor – Akihito
 Prime Minister – Naoto Kan (D-Tokyo) until September 2, Yoshihiko Noda (D–Chiba)
 Chief Cabinet Secretary: Yoshito Sengoku until January 14, Yukio Edano until September 2, Osamu Fujimura
 Chief Justice of the Supreme Court: Hironobu Takesaki
 President of the House of Representatives: Takahiro Yokomichi (D–Hokkaidō)
 President of the House of Councillors: Takeo Nishioka (D–proportional) until November 5, Kenji Hirata (D–Gifu) from November 14
 Diet sessions: 177th (regular, January 24 to August 31), 178th (extraordinary, September 13 to September 30), 179th (extraordinary, October 20 to December 9)

Governors
Aichi Prefecture: Masaaki Kanda (until 15 February); Hideaki Omura (starting 15 February)
Akita Prefecture: Norihisa Satake
Aomori Prefecture: Shingo Mimura
Chiba Prefecture: Kensaku Morita
Ehime Prefecture: Tokihiro Nakamura
Fukui Prefecture: Issei Nishikawa 
Fukuoka Prefecture: Wataru Asō (until 22 April); Hiroshi Ogawa (starting 23 April)
Fukushima Prefecture: Yūhei Satō 
Gifu Prefecture: Hajime Furuta
Gunma Prefecture: Masaaki Osawa 
Hiroshima Prefecture: Hidehiko Yuzaki
Hokkaido: Harumi Takahashi
Hyogo Prefecture: Toshizō Ido
Ibaraki Prefecture: Masaru Hashimoto 
Ishikawa Prefecture: Masanori Tanimoto
Iwate Prefecture: Takuya Tasso
Kagawa Prefecture: Keizō Hamada
Kagoshima Prefecture: Satoshi Mitazono 
Kanagawa Prefecture: Shigefumi Matsuzawa (until 22 April); Yuji Kuroiwa (starting 23 April)
Kochi Prefecture: Masanao Ozaki 
Kumamoto Prefecture: Ikuo Kabashima
Kyoto Prefecture: Keiji Yamada 
Mie Prefecture: Akihiko Noro (until 20 April); Eikei Suzuki (starting 21 April)
Miyagi Prefecture: Yoshihiro Murai
Miyazaki Prefecture: Hideo Higashikokubaru (until 20 January); Shunji Kōno (starting 20 January)
Nagano Prefecture: Shuichi Abe
Nagasaki Prefecture: Hōdō Nakamura 
Nara Prefecture: Shōgo Arai
Niigata Prefecture: Hirohiko Izumida 
Oita Prefecture: Katsusada Hirose
Okayama Prefecture: Masahiro Ishii 
Okinawa Prefecture: Hirokazu Nakaima
Osaka Prefecture:
 until 31 October: Tōru Hashimoto
 31 October-28 November: Yasuyuki Ogawa 
 starting 20 November: Ichirō Matsui
Saga Prefecture: Yasushi Furukawa 
Saitama Prefecture: Kiyoshi Ueda 
Shiga Prefecture: Yukiko Kada 
Shiname Prefecture: Zenbe Mizoguchi
Shizuoka Prefecture: Heita Kawakatsu
Tochigi Prefecture: Tomikazu Fukuda
Tokushima Prefecture: Kamon Iizumi
Tokyo: Shintarō Ishihara 
Tottori Prefecture: Shinji Hirai
Toyama Prefecture: Takakazu Ishii 
Wakayama Prefecture: Yoshinobu Nisaka
Yamagata Prefecture: Mieko Yoshimura 
Yamaguchi Prefecture: Sekinari Nii 
Yamanashi Prefecture: Shōmei Yokouchi

Events

January
 January 14 – Prime Minister of Japan Naoto Kan reshuffles his Cabinet.
 January 22 – An unmanned Japanese H-II Transfer Vehicle HTV-2 Resupply craft was launched atop the H-IIB rocket on a mission to deliver cargo to the International Space Station.
 January 26 – Shinmoedake volcano erupts in Shinmoedake and the surrounding areas, continuing until no earlier than March 10, in southern Kyushu Island.

February
 February 6 – The Japan Sumo Association cancels the Spring Grand Sumo Tournament in light of a match fixing scandal, the first time the event has been canceled since 1946.
 February 26 – Nintendo's first 3D portable game console "Nintendo 3DS" is released in Japan.

March
 March 7 – Seiji Maehara resigns as Foreign Minister of Japan after becoming involved in an illegal political donation scandal.
 March 9 – Takeaki Matsumoto is sworn in as the Foreign Minister of Japan, replacing Seiji Maehara who resigned following a political donations scandal.
 March 11 – A 8.9-magnitude earthquake hits offshore of Japan's Miyagi prefecture, resulting in tsunami waves as high as 10 metres, causing an accident at Fukushima I Nuclear Power Plant
 March 12 – Kyushu Shinkansen opens between Yatsushiro and Hakata of Fukuoka, with the start of direct high-speed train between Osaka to Kagoshima. 
 March 23 – Tokyo tap water became contaminated by radiation due to the Fukushima I nuclear accidents.
 March 23 – The Grand Bench of the Supreme Court rules that voting weight disparity in the 2009 general election for the House of Representatives was in an unconstitutional state.
 March 25 – Vegetables grown in Tokyo were contaminated by radiation.
 March 31 – The Grand Prince Hotel Akasaka was due to be closed on this date, but remained open through June 2011 to house people displaced by the earthquake, tsunami, and nuclear alert.

May
 May 4 – Osaka Station City, the largest enclosed shopping mall in Japan, including a cinema complex, a department store, and commercial facilities, opens in Osaka.
 May 10 – GoExPanda becomes Mascot of TV Asahi in Tokyo.
 May 12 – Worst heist in Japan: 604-million-yen robbery, in which a 36-year-old security company's workers are injured in Tachikawa, Tokyo. Six men are arrested on suspicion the heist on July 31.

July
 July 17 – The Japan women's national football team defeats the United States women's national football team on penalties, after a 2-2 extra-time scoreline, to win the 2011 FIFA Women's World Cup.
 July 21 – Tatsuya Ichihashi is sentenced to life in prison for the murder of Lindsay Hawker.
 July 24 – Analog television ceases operations in 44 of the 47 prefectures of Japan.

August
 August 15 – Japan's Cabinet approves a plan to establish a new energy watchdog under the Environment Ministry.
 August 26 – Naoto Kan announces his resignation as Prime Minister of Japan.

September
 September 2 – Yoshihiko Noda becomes Prime Minister of Japan.
 September 5 - Typhoon Talas, following massive rains and landslides in Kii Peninsula, resulting to death toll number of 94 persons.

October
 October 26 – Tsuyoshi Kikukawa resigns as the President and Chairman of Olympus Corporation, as financial and law enforcement bodies in Japan, the United States and the United Kingdom investigate the optical equipment company's acquisitions in recent years.

December
 December 23 – Rengō Kantai Shirei Chōkan: Yamamoto Isoroku was released.

Other events
 Prefectural and selected municipal elections in major cities:
 January 30 – 2011 Yamanashi gubernatorial election
 February 6 – Triple election in Nagoya, Aichi: 2011 Aichi gubernatorial election, 2011 Nagoya mayoral election and Nagoya city council recall referendum.
 March 13 – 2011 Nagoya city council election
 April 10 and 24 – 2011 Japanese unified regional elections (12 governors, 41 parliaments, mayors and councils in several hundred municipalities)
 June 5 – 2011 Aomori gubernatorial election
 July 3 – 2011 Gunma gubernatorial election
 July 31 – 2011 Saitama gubernatorial election
 August 28 – 2011 Sendai city council election (originally scheduled for the unified elections but postponed following the Tōhoku earthquake)
 September 11 -2011 Iwate gubernatorial election and 2011 Iwate prefectural election (originally scheduled for the unified elections but postponed following the Tōhoku earthquake).
 November 13 – 2011 Miyagi prefectural election (originally scheduled for the unified elections but postponed following the Tōhoku earthquake): the LDP loses some seats, but remains strongest party with 28 of the 59 assembly seats.
 November 20 – 2011 Fukushima prefectural election (originally scheduled for the unified elections but postponed following the Tōhoku earthquake): With many voters displaced by earthquake, tsunami and nuclear accidents, turnout reaches a historical low at 47.5 percent; the LDP gains one seat and now holds 27 of the 58 assembly seats.
 November 27 – 2011 Kōchi gubernatorial election (uncontested): With explicit or implicit support of all established parties including the Communists, governor Masanao Ozaki is reelected without vote for a second term – the first uncontested gubernatorial election since Yoshihiro Katayama's reelection in Tottori in 2003.
 November 27 – Double election in Osaka: Major issue of both the 2011 Osaka gubernatorial election and the 2011 Osaka city mayoral election were resigned governor and mayoral candidate Tōru Hashimoto's Osaka Metropolis plan to dissolve the cities of Osaka and Sakai and reorganize them like Tokyo's wards as special wards of Osaka prefecture. Incumbent Osaka city mayor Kunio Hiramatsu was opposed to the plan and was supported by both major parties; even the JCP nominated no candidate for Osaka mayor for the first time since 1963 to support his reelection. Despite support from all established parties and all other candidates dropping out of the race, Hiramatsu lost the mayoral election to Hashimoto by a wide margin; and Hashimoto's candidate for governor, Ichirō Matsui comfortably won the gubernatorial race against Kaoru Kurata (both major parties), one Communist and several minor independent candidates (including perennial candidate Mac Akasaka).

Deaths

 January 3 – Nakamura Tomijyuro V, 81, Japanese Kabuki actor
 January 5 – Keijiro Yamashita, Japanese rockabilly singer
 January 11 – Kozo Haraguchi, 100, Japanese track and field athlete, respiratory failure
 January 14 – Toshiyuki Hosokawa, Japanese actor, acute subdural hematoma
 January 14 – Ben Wada, 80, Japanese television director, esophageal cancer
 January 17 – Shinichiro Sakurai, 81, Japanese automotive engineer, heart failure.
 February 5 – Hiroko Nagata, 65, Japanese radical and murderer, vice-chairman of United Red Army.
 February 13 – Nobutoshi Kihara, Japanese electronics engineer for Sony.
 April 17 – Osamu Dezaki, 67, director of anime, lung cancer.
 April 21 – Yoshiko Tanaka, 55, actress, breast cancer.
 April 23 – Norio Ohga, 81, businessman and CEO of Sony
 May 2 – Shigeo Yaegashi, 78, footballer
 May 12 – Miyu Uehara, 24, gravure idol and television personality, suicide
 May 16 – Kiyoshi Kodama, 77, actor
 May 18 – Seiseki Abe, 96, shodo and aikido teacher
 May 21 – Hiroyuki Nagato, 77, actor
 June 6 – Masashi Ohuchi, 67, Olympic weightlifter
 June 9 – Tomoko Kawakami, 41, voice actress
 June 28 – Osamu Kobayashi, 76, voice actor and executive director
 July 5 – Shinji Wada, 61, manga artist
 July 9 – Hideo Tanaka, 78, director
 July 17 – Takaji Mori, 67, footballer
 July 19 – Yoshio Harada, 71, actor
 July 26 – Sakyo Komatsu, 80, science fiction writer
 July 27 – Rei Harakami, 40, musician 
 July 27 – Hideki Irabu, 42, baseball player
 August 4 – Naoki Matsuda, 34, football player
 August 5 – Takehiko Maeda, 82, television writer
 August 15 – Tōru Shōriki, 92, baseball team owner (Tokyo Giants) and former CEO of Yomiuri Newspaper
 August 21 – Muga Takewaki, 67, actor
 September 6 – Shigeri Akabane, 70, professional wrestler
 September 7 – Hiroe Yuki, 62, badminton player
 December 31 – , 81, volleyball coach

See also
 2011 in Japanese music
 2011 in Japanese television
 List of Japanese films of 2011

References

 
Years of the 21st century in Japan
Japan
2010s in Japan
Japan